is a town located in Saihaku District, Tottori Prefecture, Japan. , the town had an estimated population of 10,348 in 3894 households and a population density of 91 persons per km².

Geography
Nanbu is located in the Chūgoku Mountains in western Tottori Prefecture and borders Shimane Prefecture to the west.

Neighboring municipalities
Tottori Prefecture
Yonago
Hōki
Hino
Nichinan
Shimane Prefecture
Yasugi

Climate
Nanbu is classified as a Humid subtropical climate (Köppen Cfa) characterized by warm summers and cold winters with heavy snowfall.  The average annual temperature in Nanbu is 13.5 °C. The average annual rainfall is 1770 mm with September as the wettest month. The temperatures are highest on average in August, at around 25.26 °C, and lowest in January, at around 2.2 °C.

Demography
Per Japanese census data, the population of Nanbu has been as follows.

History
The area of Nanbu was part of ancient Hōki Province. During the Edo Period, it was part of the holdings of the Ikeda clan of Tottori Domain. Following the Meiji restoration. the area was organized into villages within Saihaku District on October 1, 1889 with the establishment of the modern municipalities system. Nanbu was founded on October 1, 2004 from the merger of the towns of Saihaku and Aimi, both from Saihaku District.

Government
Nanbu has a mayor-council form of government with a directly elected mayor and a unicameral town council of 14 members. Nanbu, collectively with the other municipalities of Saihaku District, contributes three members to the Tottori Prefectural Assembly. . In terms of national politics, the town is part of Tottori 2nd district of the lower house of the Diet of Japan.

Economy
The economy of Nanbu is based agriculture.

Education
Nanbu has three public elementary schools and two public junior high schools operated by the town government. The town does not have a high school.

Transportation

Railway 
Nanbu is not served by any passenger rail service. The closest train station is Yonago Station in Yonago, served by the JR West San'in Main Line and JR West Sakai Line.

Highways

Local attractions
It features extensive gardens, multi-lingual guide pamphlets, and a large indoor orchid cultivation area.

References

External links

Nanbu official website 
Tottori Hanakairo website 

Towns in Tottori Prefecture